The 2013–14 Richmond Spiders men's basketball team represented the University of Richmond during the 2013–14 NCAA Division I men's basketball season. Richmond competed as a member of the Atlantic 10 Conference (A-10) under ninth-year head coach Chris Mooney and played its home games at the Robins Center. They finished the season 19–14, 8–8 in A-10 play to finish in seventh place. They advanced to the quarterfinals of the A-10 tournament where they lost to VCU. Despite having 19 wins, they did not participate in a post season tournament.

Preseason

Recruiting

Roster

Schedule

|-
!colspan=9 style="background:#000066; color:#FFFFFF;"| Regular season

|-
!colspan=9 style="background:#000066; color:#FFFFFF;"| Atlantic 10 tournament

Source:

References

Richmond Spiders men's basketball seasons
Richmond
Richmond
Richmond